The canton of Aveyron et Tarn is an administrative division of the Aveyron department, southern France. It was created at the French canton reorganisation which came into effect in March 2015. Its seat is in Rieupeyroux.

It consists of the following communes:
 
Le Bas-Ségala
Bor-et-Bar
La Capelle-Bleys
Castelmary
Crespin
La Fouillade
Lescure-Jaoul
Lunac
Monteils
Morlhon-le-Haut
Najac
Prévinquières
Rieupeyroux
Saint-André-de-Najac
La Salvetat-Peyralès
Sanvensa
Tayrac

References

Cantons of Aveyron